Thomas J. Pelphrey (born July 28, 1982) is an American actor. He is best known for playing the roles of Jonathan Randall and Mick Dante in the CBS television series Guiding Light and As the World Turns respectively, Kurt Bunker in the Cinemax television series Banshee, Ward Meachum in the Netflix original series Iron Fist, Ben Davis in the Netflix original series Ozark, and Perry Abbott in the Prime Video original series Outer Range as well as a supporting role in David Fincher's film Mank and the lead role of Jason Derek Brown in the true crime film American Murderer.

Early life and education
Born in Howell, New Jersey, Pelphrey graduated from Howell High School in 2000, and from Rutgers University (Mason Gross School of the Arts) in 2004 with a Bachelor of Fine Arts degree.

Career

Guiding Light
Pelphrey's most notable role has been the role of Jonathan Randall, the son of Reva Shayne and her late former husband, Richard Winslow, on the CBS soap opera Guiding Light. He joined the cast in September 2004 and received critical acclaim for his portrayal of anti-hero Jonathan.

He was nominated for a Daytime Emmy Award for "Outstanding Younger Actor" in 2005 and won the award the following year in April 2006. He received a third consecutive nomination in the same category in 2007 but lost to Bryton McClure. Pelphrey won his second Daytime Emmy Award for "Outstanding Younger Actor" in 2008.

As the World Turns
Pelphrey signed a contract to play "Mick" on As the World Turns beginning in October 2009. His run ended in February 2010 when his character was sent to prison for his misdeeds. Pelphrey earned an Emmy pre-nomination for Best Supporting Actor for his role as Mick Dante.

Other television roles
On March 30, 2007, he appeared in an episode of Numb3rs, "Pandora's Box". On October 17, 2008, he appeared in an episode of "Ghost Whisperer", and the following season in an episode of Law & Order: Special Victims Unit. In 2015 Pelphrey landed the recurring role of Kurt Bunker, a former neo-nazi trying to reintegrate into society, on Cinemax's action drama Banshee. To prepare for this role he started lifting weights and did research by reading books on the neo-Nazi movement in America. In 2017, he appeared in Iron Fist as Ward Meachum and portrayed Ben Davis on the third season of the Netflix crime drama Ozark which was released on March 27, 2020. His portrayal in the latter received critical acclaim and the lack of an Emmy nomination was perceived as a snub by fans and critics. Nonetheless, Pelphrey received nominations for Critics' Choice Television Award for Best Supporting Actor in a Drama Series, Satellite Award for Best Supporting Actor – Series, Miniseries or Television Film and Screen Actors Guild Award for Outstanding Performance by an Ensemble in a Drama Series (shared with the cast). In the final season of Ozark (2022), Pelphrey reprised the role of Ben Davis as a guest appearance, for which he received an Emmy nomination for Outstanding Guest Actor in a Drama Series.

Recently in 2022, he has starred in the Amazon Prime Video series Outer Range as Perry Abbott and will star in the upcoming HBO Max miniseries Love and Death as Don Crowder.

Theater
From September 6, 2007, to September 30, 2007, Pelphrey performed in Kevin Mandel's A New Television Arrives Finally as the title character, at Theatre 54, in New York. Pelphrey starred in In God's Hat at the Peter Jay Sharp Theater, in New York City, through August 7, 2010. In 2012, he appeared in the Broadway cast of the musical drama End of the Rainbow as Mickey Deans; in 2015, he returned to Broadway in a revival of Fool for Love, playing Martin.

Personal life 
In 2022, Pelphrey began dating actress Kaley Cuoco. They made their first public appearance as a couple at a Hollywood Walk of Fame ceremony in May 2022. Pelphrey and Cuoco announced via Instagram in October 2022 that they were expecting their first child together, a daughter.

Filmography

Film

Television

Video games

References

External links

CBS website biography of Tom Pelphrey

1982 births
Living people
American male soap opera actors
Howell High School (New Jersey) alumni

Male actors from New Jersey
People from Howell Township, New Jersey
Rutgers University alumni
Daytime Emmy Award winners
Daytime Emmy Award for Outstanding Younger Actor in a Drama Series winners